Bang & Olufsen (B&O) is a high-end consumer electronics company that designs and manufactures audio products, television sets, and telephones, originally from Denmark, founded in 1925 by Peter Bang and Svend Olufsen, who designed a radio to work with alternating current, a product of significance at a time when most radios were still running on batteries.

History

Early history

Peter Bang (1900–1957), son of Camillo Bang, a successful Danish businessman, showed great interest in radio technology from an early age. After graduating as an engineer in 1924, he spent six months working in a radio factory in the USA. When he returned to Denmark, he collaborated with his friend Svend Olufsen (1897–1949), whose parents made the attic of their manor house in Struer in Jutland available for experiments. When they officially opened their business in 1925, Bang focused on the technology while Olufsen was dealing with business. There were a number of successful developments in the 1930s and 1940s, including a sound recording system for the film industry, roof-mounted loudspeakers for circuses and army vehicles, and the iconic Beolit 39 radio that featured a Bakelite cabinet. 

However, it was many years before their business became significantly profitable. The firm suffered a major setback towards the end of World War II when its factory at Gimsing in Struer in northwestern Jutland was on fire burnt down by pro-Nazi saboteurs as a punishment for the management's refusal to team up with the Germans. Undeterred, Bang and Olufsen rebuilt the factory, and they produced electric razors until 1955, and then moving on to develop a range of radio, radiogram, and television sets, that was influenced later by a designer named Ib Fabiansen who began work for the company in 1957.

In the 1990s, B&O opened its dedicated stores, selling directly to customers but not selling through retailers, and the production of audio separates was discontinued in favor of mini-type audio systems sold, as was before for B&O, at a price that was higher than the industry average.

Recent history
Because of the economic crisis of 2008 the company experienced a sharp decline in sales and announced significant losses; between 2008 and 2009, annual revenue declined from $853 million to $528 million, and its stock price dropped from $52 to $8.50. A restructuring plan included 300 layoffs in Denmark on 21 October 2008, and the abandonment of development of new mobile phones, MP3 players, and standalone systems like DVD2 and HDR2. Instead, the company focused on its traditional strengths: high-quality audio and video products as well as sound systems for the automotive industry. B&O returned to profitability in 2010.

In January 2015, B&O revealed that the firm would consider bid approaches from competitors due to a profit warning issued at the end of 2014.

In March 2015, HP Inc. announced that B&O would become the company's new premium audio partner for its computers and other devices.

In May 2015, Harman International announced the completion of its acquisition of Bang & Olufsen's car audio business.

In March 2017, Tymphany, an audio ODM based in Hong Kong and with manufacturing operations in Dongchen, announced the acquisition of the engineering and manufacturing operation in the Czech Republic from Bang & Olufsen.

In Aug 2017, LG announced that B&O would become the company's new premium audio partner for its mobile devices.

In January 2020, Bang & Olufsen A/S reported its third consecutive quarterly loss as the Danish hi-fi maker struggled with a buildup of inventory after consumers balked at buying $500 headphones.

Operations and products
Despite its decision to suspend the manufacture of separate components, B&O continues to develop and market loudspeakers. Its flagship speaker, the BeoLab 5, uses digital signal processing to adjust its frequency response to the room and location in which it is placed. Its midrange and treble drivers use the audio lens technology developed by Sausalito Audio's Manny LaCarrubba to spread the sound over a 180-degree range in order to fill the room, overcoming the directional range limitations of normal midrange and treble drivers, and preventing the sound from reflecting off the ceiling and floor before reaching the listener. B&O later acquired the audio lens technology in 2007.

In 2003, B&O entered into an agreement with Audi to provide an advanced sound system and in 2005 a sound system based on the BeoLab 5 with 1000 W amplifiers became available to Audi's flagship model, the A8. Audi markets this sound system using the Bang & Olufsen brand name. A unique feature of this sound system is its motorized tweeters that emerge from the dashboard when the sound system is turned on.

Audi also extended the optional advanced sound system to their A4, A5, A6, A7, A8, Q5, Q7, TT and R8 models. It is a US$6,300 option on the A8/Q7. B&O also supplies sound systems for higher-end, premium vehicles such as the Aston Martin DBS, Rapide, BMW 5 Series, BMW 5 Series Gran Turismo, BMW 6 Series, BMW M6, BMW's flagship 7 Series, BMW X5 and Mercedes-Benz AMG models. Also, Ford has begun to replace the Sony sound systems in their vehicles with B&O PLAY audio systems in new models, such as the revised 2018 F-150 and the 2019 Ranger.

In addition to consumer products the company also produces business-to-business services, particularly in the area of custom audio-visual installations for car manufacturers, and the hospitality industry. Additionally the company's expertise in aluminium manufacturing is available to other businesses for the production of non-B&O products.

Design
B&O has a distinctive design appeal that Wired described as "quality media delivery via striking objects". Their work with radios and loudspeakers led them to value high-fidelity musical reproduction uninfluenced by technological limitations; in Danish Ærlig musikgengivelse, meaning "honest music reproduction". To this end, psychoacoustics was important to designing and testing B&O products.

By 1960, B&O had begun its foray into global markets with star designers Henning Moldenhawer and Jacob Jensen, who designed 234 products for B&O from 1965 to 1985. B&O hires designers rather than directly employing them in the company. David Lewis, who became involved with B&O in 1965 then went on to design most of the company's products after 1980. In 1978, the Museum of Modern Art in New York City held an exhibition dedicated to Bang & Olufsen designs. It is known to give its designers a lot of free rein.

It also has been debated that Apple's iPod design was inspired by B&O's BeoCom 6000, a wireless telephone designed by Henrik Sørig Thomsen with a wheel to scroll.

Subsidiaries
 ICEpower a/s was formed in 1999 as a joint venture between B&O and Karsten Nielsen. The company is a technology research and design organisation working in the field of switching type Class-D amplifier.
 Bang & Olufsen Medicom a/s manufacturers and designs medical products such as inhalers and automatic syringes.
 Bang & Olufsen Telecom a/s.
 B&O PLAY is the newest member of the Bang & Olufsen family launched in 2012.

Products
B&O products often have a unique appearance and user-interface. Early models are collectible decades later. B&O uses a Beo prefix for the names of its product lines.

Beocord refers to audio tape recorders, both open-reel types and cassette decks, and video cassette recorders. B&O was a pioneer in cassette technology, having had design involvement with Dolby HX Pro.
Beomaster refers to receivers. B&O's more recent receivers feature the ability to receive complex programming. The 5000 series through the 7000 series features two-way communication with the remote controller, called the "Master Control Panel". The most famous Beomaster is the Beomaster 1900 from 1976. It was the first consumer electronics product with touch controls. Similar models were made until the end of the 1980s
Beogram refers to turntables and, later, CD players. Jacob Jensen's first Beogram design was unlike prior B&O designs; the company committed to only making 50 but went on to make thousands. B&O developed electronically controlled tangential turntables in the 1970s, starting with the Beogram 4000 of 1972. The last tangential tracking turntable was the Beogram 7000, which were taken off the production lines in 1995. B&O has also produced radial tracking turntables. The Beogram 6000 is on display in the Museum of Modern Art for its unique appearance and use of a tangential tracking tonearm.
Beolab refers to amplifiers and powered speakers (loudspeakers with built-in amplifiers), and as of 2011, all new powered speakers use ICEpower.
Beovox refers to passive loudspeakers (i.e., without internal amplification).
Beolit refers to the range of portable radios.
Beosystem earlier referred to a line of components—e.g., Beomaster, Beogram, and Beocord—which matched one another in both appearance and operation. The first Beosystem were the Beosystem 1200 of 1969–1973, and the last were the Beosystem 7000 of 1992–1994. And now refers to the Audio/Video central processing unit (BeoSystem 2; Beosystem 3).
Beocenter refers to one-piece audio systems. B&O, at one time, made elaborate products that incorporated receivers, turntables, and cassette decks into a single components called "Beocentres".
Beomic refers to performance or recording microphones, such as the dynamic microphone DM-1, or ribbon microphones, such as the BM-2, BM-3, etc.
BeoCom & BeoTalk refers to the company's line of telephones and telephone accessories, such as answering machines.
Beovision refers to a line of televisions.
Beosound refers to the current range of music systems and audio products. Since November 2010 the range has included an iPod/iPhone/iPad-Dock.
Beotime refers to the company's advanced alarm clock
Beoplayer refers to the company's media player for free download
Beoplay is a consumer-oriented brand marketing headphones, compact wired speakers and wireless speakers.
Beosound Edge is a speaker that can either be mounted on the wall or stood on the floor, it is designed on the simple accelerometer mechanism which makes essentially the whole speaker into a giant volume knob. It was first presented at the IFA 2018.
Serene and Serenata phones created in partnership with Samsung.
Beosound Shape is a customisable modular wall mounted speaker system that consists of hexagonal tiles designed to hide one of each hi-fi module—speaker, amplifier or acoustic damper—underneath its fabric cover.

See also
 Beocenter 9500
 List of phonograph manufacturers

Notes

References

Further reading

External links 
 
 
 Thogersen – A collector's website with photos of B&O products throughout the decades
 Beocentral – A reference site containing descriptions and photos of B&O equipment
 Beomanuals – Free user and service manuals for Bang & Olufsen
 BeoWorld – Everything Bang & Olufsen, community and forum for fans around the globe
 BeoPhile.com (via web.archive.org) – Speaking the language of Bang & Olufsen: comprehensive Web site for B&O collectors

 
Audio amplifier manufacturers
Compact Disc player manufacturers
Danish brands
Danish design
Loudspeaker manufacturers
Luxury brands
Multinational companies headquartered in Denmark
Phonograph manufacturers
Purveyors to the Court of Denmark
Electronics companies established in 1925
Headphones manufacturers
Danish companies established in 1925